The Stabilization fund of the Russian Federation was a sovereign wealth fund established based on a resolution of the Government of Russia on 1 January 2004, as a part of the federal budget to balance the federal budget at the time of when oil price falls below a cut-off price, currently set at US$27 per barrel. In February 2008 the Stabilization Fund was split into a Reserve Fund, which is invested abroad in low-yield securities and used when oil and gas incomes fall, and the National Welfare Fund, which invests in riskier, higher-return vehicles, as well as federal budget expenditures. The Reserve Fund was given $125 billion and the National Welfare Fund was given $32 billion. By the end of 2016 the two funds consisted respectively of $38.2 and 72.2 billion.

The Fund was created to create a reserve of liquidity with the additional benefit of reducing inflationary pressure and insulating the economy of Russia from volatility of raw material export earnings, which was among the reasons of the 1998 Russian financial crisis. To prevent high inflation rates the fund is invested into abroad only.

Aggregate amount of the Stabilization fund of the Russian Federation

Recent developments
According to amendments to Russia's budget code inspired by President Vladimir Putin's budget address of March 2007 and passed in April 2007, in February 2008 the Stabilization Fund was supposed to be split into a Reserve Fund, to be invested abroad in low-yield securities and used when oil and gas incomes fall, and a Future Generations' Fund (later renamed the National Wealth Fund), which will invest in riskier, higher return vehicles, as well as federal budget expenditures. Unlike the Stabilization Fund, the new funds will also accumulate revenues from oil products and natural gas.

On 21 May 2007, President Vladimir Putin urged the government to pump surplus oil revenue into domestic stocks by buying Russian blue chips such as Gazprom and Rosneft, which had fallen since the beginning of the year, instead of foreign securities, which previously had been explicitly forbidden due to fear of inflation.

Accumulation and expenditure
The Fund accumulates revenues from the export duty for oil and the tax on
oil mining operations when the price for Urals oil exceeds the set cut-off price.

The capital of the Fund may be used to cover the federal budget deficit and
for other purposes, if its balance exceeds 500 billion rubles, spending amounts are subject to the federal budget law for the corresponding fiscal year.

As the capital of the Fund had exceeded the level of 500 billion rubles in
2005, part of its surplus was used for early foreign debt repayments as well as to
cover Russian Pension Fund's deficit. The details of these transactions in 2005 are
as follows:

Investment Policy

Governance Structure

The Fund is managed by the Russian Ministry of Finance, in accordance with the procedure defined by the Government of the Russian Federation. Some functions of asset management may be delegated to the Central Bank of the Russian Federation ("the Bank of Russia"), based on its agreement with the Government.

Concerning the Fund's objectives, its capital is to be invested in foreign sovereign debt securities. Securities' eligibility criteria are subject to the Government's approval.

The Ministry of Finance is empowered by the Government to establish the
Fund's currency composition and its strategic asset allocation in line with the
investment policy for the Fund's management.

The Ministry of Finance may use one or both of the following schemes
defined by the Government to invest the Fund's capital.

The Fund assets are currently invested solely under second scheme
(allocation to the Federal Treasury's accounts with the Bank of Russia).

Investment Guidelines
The Government determined that eligible debt securities for the Fund investment are to correspond to the following requirements.

Debt securities on the date of purchase will have a minimum remaining maturity of 0,25 years and are not to exceed three years.

The Fund assets are currently invested in the following currency composition:

Currency composition and the maturity restrictions are applicable to all Fund's assets and are subject to revisions by the Ministry of Finance.

Reporting

The Ministry of Finance publishes a monthly report in mass media on the
Fund's accumulation, spending and balance and reports quarterly and annually to the Government
on accumulation, investment and spending of the Fund's capital.
The Government will report quarterly and annually on the Fund's accumulation,
spending and investment of capital to both chambers of the
Russian Parliament (State Duma and Council of Federation).

See also
Banking in Russia
Central Bank of Russia
Federal budget of Russia

References

External links
Official website
SWF Institute Russia's SWF

Government of Russia
Economy of Russia
Energy in Russia
Sovereign wealth funds